Aldeia Galega da Merceana is a former civil parish, located in the municipality of Alenquer, in western Portugal. In 2013, the parish merged into the new parish Aldeia Galega da Merceana e Aldeia Gavinha. It covers 19.69 km² in area, with 2175 inhabitants as of 2001.

References

Former parishes of Alenquer, Portugal